Thomas Fenner (born 12 May 1904) was an English professional footballer who played as an inside forward.

Career
Born in Warrington, Fenner played for Wigan Borough, Notts County and Bradford City.

For Bradford City he made seven appearances in the Football League, scoring three goals. He retired due to injury in November 1934.

Personal life
He married the sister of St Mirren and Scotland defender George Walker in 1935.

Sources

References

1904 births
Year of death missing
English footballers
Wigan Borough F.C. players
Notts County F.C. players
Bradford City A.F.C. players
English Football League players
Association football inside forwards
Footballers from Uxbridge